The WEPA Group with its headquarters in Arnsberg-Müschede is a German family business for sanitary paper. With approx. 4.000 employees and a turnover of approx. 1.3 billion euros, WEPA is the third largest manufacturer of hygiene paper in Europe.

History 

WEPA (Westfälische Papierfabrik) was founded in 1948 by Paul Krengel as a wholesale company for lining, wrapping, and gift wrap paper. It was not until 1953 that the processing of hygiene papers began in Arnsberg. In 1958, the company's own paper production began with the construction of the first paper machine for crepe paper in Müschede.

Construction of the plant in Marsberg-Giershagen in 1963 marked the beginning of further processing for the manufactured paper. In 1980 the company started to develop its first private labels. In 2001 WEPA took over Kriepa GmbH in Kriebethal (today WEPA Saxony), where a joint venture with the paper factory Kübler & Niethammer had already existed since 1990.

From 2004 onwards the company expanded. WEPA consequently founded the joint venture GC & WEPA S.L. in Ejea de los Caballeros, Spain, and took over the majority shares of the Polish hygiene paper manufacturer Fabryka Papieru Piechowice SA (today WEPA Piechowice) and the Mainz mill of Kimberly-Clark. In 2009, the operating establishments of an Italian competitor in Italy (Lucca and Cassino), Germany (Leuna) and France (Lille) were also integrated into the WEPA Group.

In 2015, WEPA sold its shares in the Spanish joint venture and bought a further site in Troyes, France. 2 years later, with the takeover of the family business Van Houtem, a site in Swalmen, Netherlands, for the manufacture of AfH products was incorporated.

In 2018 WEPA took over all shares of the joint venture UK Northwood & WEPA LTD (now WEPA UK), which was founded in 2014 in Bridgend.

In 2019, WEPA expanded its locations with the acquisition of the Greenfield plant in Château-Thierry, France. WEPA Greenfield only produces recycled fibres (DIP) cleaned of printing ink. WEPA is therefore represented with thirteen locations in six European countries. Today, the WEPA Group is managed by Martin Krengel (Chairman of the Board), Harm Bergmann-Kramer, Ralph Dihlmann, Andreas Krengel and Menno Oosterhoff. The Supervisory Board comprises Friedrich Merz (Chairman), Hans-Joachim Körber, Wilken von Hodenberg and Hartmut Wurster.

Products and brands 
Today, the WEPA Group is the third largest manufacturer of hygiene paper in Europe. According to current information, the company secures 25% of the market share in Germany and 8% in Europe.

The 21 paper machines have a production capacity of 780,000 tonnes, which are processed into toilet paper, tissues, cosmetic tissues, paper towels, napkins and industrial rolls at more than 90 automatic converting machines. In the consumer sector, WEPA sells the manufactured hygiene papers mainly as private label products (trademarks) to the European food retail trade. In addition, the WEPA Professional division offers hygiene paper and dispenser systems with the brands BlackSatino and Satino by WEPA typically for public washrooms, industry, offices or health care facilities.

Locations / production sites 

With thirteen locations in six European countries, WEPA operates plants at the following locations:

 Arnsberg-Müschede, North Rhine-Westphalia, Germany
 Marsberg-Giershagen, North Rhine-Westphalia, Germany
 Kriebstein-Kriebethal, Saxony, Germany
 Leuna, Saxony-Anhalt, Germany
 Mainz, Rhineland-Palatinate, Germany
 Lille, France
 Troyes, France
 Château-Thierry, France
 Bridgend, Great Britain
 Cassino, Italy
 Lucca, Italy
 Swalmen, Netherlands
 Piechowice, Poland

References

Companies based in North Rhine-Westphalia
Pulp and paper companies of Germany